In Mahayana Buddhism, bodhicitta, ("enlightenment-mind" or "the thought of awakening"), is the mind (citta) that is aimed at awakening (bodhi), with wisdom and compassion for the benefit of all sentient beings. Bodhicitta is the defining quality of the Mahayana bodhisattva (a being striving towards Buddhahood) and the act of giving rise to bodhicitta (bodhicittotpāda) is what makes a bodhisattva a bodhisattva. The Daśabhūmika Sūtra explains that the arising of bodhicitta is the first step in the bodhisattva's career.

Etymology
Etymologically, the word is a combination of the Sanskrit words bodhi and citta. Bodhi means "awakening" or "enlightenment". Citta derives from the Sanskrit root cit, and means "that which is conscious" (i.e., mind or consciousness). Bodhicitta may be translated as "awakening mind" or "mind of enlightenment". It is also sometimes translated as "the thought of enlightenment."

Definition

Indian sources 
The term bodhicitta is defined and explained in different ways by different Mahayana Buddhist sources. According to Paul Williams, the basic meaning of bodhicitta in Indian sources (such as Atisha's Bodhipathapradipa) is the lofty motivation to "strive to bring a complete end to all the sufferings of others along with their own suffering...This bodhicitta results from deep compassion (karuna) for the suffering of others."

According to the Bodhisattvabhumi, the bodhisattva who gives rise to bodhicitta thinks thus:"O may I obtain supreme and perfect Enlightenment, promote the good of all beings, and establish them in the final and complete nirvana and in the Buddha-knowledge!" 

Thus, according to the Bodhisattvabhumi, bodhicitta has two objects of thought or themes (alambana): bodhi and the good of the living beings (sattv-ārtha). 

According to Indian sources, the bodhicitta aspiration provides incalculable merit (such as good rebirths, a weakening of the defilements, increased mindfulness and luck). Bodhicitta is what makes someone a Mahayana bodhisattva, a child of the Buddha. Thus, the Indian Buddhist author Shantideva (8th century) writes in his Bodhicaryavatara:Those who long to transcend the hundreds of miseries of existence, who long to relieve creatures of their sorrows, who long to enjoy many hundreds of joys, must never abandon bodhicitta.

When bodhicitta has arisen in him, a wretch, captive in the prison of existence, he is straightway hailed son of the Sugatas [the Buddhas], to be revered in the worlds of gods and men.According to Paul Williams, bodhicitta in early Mahāyāna works was less well defined and meant a "certain state of mind" characteristic of a bodhisattva. According to Ulrich Pagel, numerous Mahāyāna sūtras, like the Bodhisattvapiṭaka, see the arising of bodhicitta (bodhicittotpāda) as an ongoing process which must be constantly refurbished (rather than as a static event).

Modern definitions 
According to the 14th Dalai Lama, bodhicitta is:
the aspiration to bring about the welfare of all sentient beings and to attain buddhahood for their sake - is really the distilled essence, the squeeze juice, of all the Buddha's teachings, because ultimately, the Buddha's intention is to lead all sentient beings to perfect enlightenment.Some modern East Asian authors on Buddhism, such as D.T. Suzuki and M. Anesaki, define bodhicitta as an immanent inner awakening. For example, Anesaki writes that bodhicitta is "the primordial essence of our mind, which in itself consists in the supreme bodhi."

According to Zoketsu Norman Fischer, bodhicitta is a spontaneous wish to attain enlightenment motivated by great compassion for all sentient beings, accompanied by a falling away of the attachment to the illusion of an inherently existing self.

Fischer adds that bodhicitta, along with the mind of great compassion (mahakaruna), motivates one to attain enlightenment Buddhahood, as quickly as possible and benefit infinite sentient beings through their emanations and other skillful means. Bodhicitta is a felt need to replace others' suffering with bliss. Since the ultimate end of suffering is nirvana, bodhicitta necessarily involves a motivation to help others to awaken (to find bodhi).

Types and stages of bodhicitta 
Mahayana Buddhist thinkers also developed different models which described different forms and levels of bodhicitta. 

According to the Bodhisattvabhumi, there are two main stages of the development of bodhicitta: 

 a kind of bodhicitta which can be lost
 the permanent kind of bodhicitta which cannot be lost and leads directly to enlightenment.

Furthermore, according to Shantideva, there are two types of bodhicitta: 

 bodhicitta which is a mere wish or aspiration (bodhipranidhicitta)
 active bodhicitta (bodhiprasthanacitta) which consists of actually practicing the path in line with one's intent

In Tibetan Buddhism 
A common Tibetan Buddhist distinction is that between relative and absolute (or ultimate) bodhicitta. Relative bodhicitta is a state of mind in which the practitioner works for the good of all beings as if it were their own. Absolute bodhicitta is the wisdom of shunyata (śunyatā, a Sanskrit term often translated as "emptiness", though the alternatives "vast expanse" or "openness" or "spaciousness" probably convey the idea better to Westerners).  The concept of śunyatā in Buddhism also implies freedom from attachments.

In his book Words of My Perfect Teacher, the Tibetan Buddhist teacher Patrul Rinpoche describes three degrees of bodhicitta: 

 King-like bodhicitta, in which a bodhisattva primarily seeks his own benefit but who recognizes that his benefit depends crucially on that of his kingdom and his subjects. 
 Boatman-like bodhicitta, in which a bodhisattva ferries his passengers across the river and simultaneously, of course, ferries himself as well
 Shepherd-like bodhicitta, who makes sure that all his sheep arrive safely ahead of him and places their welfare above his own. 

According to Patrul Rinpoche, the way of the shepherd bodhisattva is the best and highest way.

Some bodhicitta practices emphasize the absolute (e.g. vipaśyanā), while others emphasize the relative (e.g. metta), but both aspects are seen in all Mahāyāna practice as essential to enlightenment, especially in the Tibetan practices of tonglen and lojong. Without the absolute, the relative can degenerate into pity and sentimentality, whereas the absolute without the relative can lead to nihilism and lack of desire to engage other sentient beings for their benefit.

Practice
Mahāyāna Buddhist practice focuses on the Bodhisattva-ideal, which begins with the arousing of bodhicitta. Mahāyāna teaches that the broader motivation of achieving one's own enlightenment "in order to help all sentient beings" is the best possible motivation one can have for any action, whether it be working in one's vocation, teaching others, or even making an incense offering. The Six Perfections (Pāramitās) of Buddhism only become true "perfections" when they are done with the motivation of bodhicitta. Thus, the action of giving (Skt. dāna) can be done in a mundane sense, or it can be a pāramitā if it is conjoined with bodhicitta. Bodhicitta is the primary positive factor to be cultivated.

Cultivation
The Mahāyāna tradition provides specific methods for the intentional cultivation of both absolute and relative bodhicitta. This cultivation is considered to be a fundamental aspect of the path to Buddhahood. Practitioners of the Mahāyāna make it their primary goal to develop genuine uncontrived bodhicitta, which remains within their mindstreams continuously without having to rely on conscious effort. This is assisted by numerous methods, contemplation, rituals and meditations, such as: relying on a spiritual friend, taking refuge in the three jewels, and contemplating the defects of samsara (cyclic existence), the benefits of arousing bodhicitta (as well as the downsides of abandoning it), and developing spiritual qualities such as faith (sraddha), mindfulness and wisdom (prajña).

Tibetan Methods 
Among the many methods for developing uncontrived bodhicitta given in Tibetan Mahāyāna teachings are:
 A. So as to arouse Bodhicitta, the main aspect, the Four Immeasurables (Brahmavihara) contemplation and practice:
 Immeasurable Loving-Kindness (Maitrī),
 Immeasurable Compassion (Karunā),
 Immeasurable Joy in the Good Fortune of Others (Muditā),
 Immeasurable Equanimity (Upekṣā) and
 B. So as to aspire Bodhicitta:
 The Lojong (mind training) practices:
 Others as equal to self: Exchanging self and others: (Tonglen) the Sending and Receiving while breathing practice,
 Others as more important: Viewing all other sentient beings as having been our mothers in infinite past lives, and feeling gratitude for the many occasions on which they have taken care of us.
 C. So as to apply Bodhicitta and achieve enlightenment:
 The repeated Pāramitās practice cycle: 1) Generosity, 2) Virtue, 3) Patience, 4) Effort, 5) Meditation, and 6) Insight.

In Lojong's 59 slogans, Point Two: The main practice, which is training in absolute and relative bodhicitta.
 A. Absolute Bodhicitta
Slogan 2. Regard all dharmas as dreams; although experiences may seem solid, they are passing memories.
Slogan 3. Examine the nature of unborn awareness.
Slogan 4. Self-liberate even the antidote.
Slogan 5. Rest in the nature of alaya, the essence, the present moment.
Slogan 6. In post-meditation, be a child of illusion.

 B.Relative Bodhicitta
Slogan 7. Sending and taking should be practiced alternately. These two should ride the breath (aka. practice Tonglen).
Slogan 8. Three objects, three poisons, three roots of virtue -- The 3 objects are friends, enemies and neutrals.  The 3 poisons are craving, aversion and indifference.  The 3 roots of virtue are the remedies.
Slogan 9. In all activities, train with slogans.
Slogan 10. Begin the sequence of sending and taking with yourself.

When only realizing Śūnyatā, the practitioner might not benefit others, so the Mahayana path unites emptiness and compassion, this keeps from falling into the two limits and remaining on the middle way. Traditionally, Bodhisattvas practice mediative concentration at the beginning toward attaining the noble one's wisdom level, then the main practice becomes benefiting others spontaneously, unlike other paths that might discontinue benefiting others.

All the conducive causes and auspicious conditions should be complete for bodhicitta to properly arise. After continued training, these qualities can arise in the mind without contrivance.

The two main traditions in taking the Bodhicitta vows are: 1) Nagarjuna's profound view chariot and, 2) Asanga's vast conduct chariot. After which this is guarded with what to avoid, and what to adopt.

The practice can be divided into three parts: 1) mind training, 2) arousing bodhicitta, and 3) training in what to adopt and what to avoid. These can be called the 1) preliminary practice, 2) main practice, and 3) concluding practice. The preliminary practice is training in the four boundless qualities. The main practice is arousing Bodhicitta and taking vows. The concluding practice is training in what to adopt and guarding without fail against what to avoid.

The Ancient Tibetan school preliminary practice cycle in the Samantabhadra to Longchenpa to Jigme Lingpa's lineage of the Excellent Part to Omniscience: Vast Expanse Heart Essence. Follow like Manjushree to dedicate with the aspiration to realize the innermost meaning and realize to attain Buddhahood as a spiritual warrior.

Two practice lineages 
Tibetan Buddhists maintain that there are two main ways to cultivate Bodhichitta, the "Seven Causes and Effects" that originates from Maitreya and was taught by Atisha, and "Exchanging Self and Others," taught by Shantideva and originally by Manjushri.

According to Tsongkhapa the seven causes and effects are thus:
recognizing all beings as your mothers;
recollecting their kindness;
the wish to repay their kindness;
love;
great compassion;
wholehearted resolve;
bodhichitta.

According to Pabongka Rinpoche the second method consists of the following meditations:
how self and others are equal;
contemplating the many faults resulting from self-cherishing;
contemplating the many good qualities resulting from cherishing others;
the actual contemplation on the interchange of self and others;
with these serving as the basis, the way to meditate on giving and taking (tonglen).

Universality
The practice and realization of bodhicitta are independent of sectarian considerations, since they are fundamentally a part of the human experience. Bodhisattvas are not only recognized in the Theravāda school of Buddhism, but in all other religious traditions and among those of no formal religious tradition. The present fourteenth Dalai Lama, for instance, regarded Mother Teresa as one of the greatest modern bodhisattvas.

Source texts 
Important later source texts on bodhicitta for Tibetan Buddhism include:

 Bodhisattvabhumi (The Bodhisattva Levels)
 Śāntideva's A Guide to the Bodhisattva's Way Of Life (c. 700 CE),
 Atisha's Bodhipathapradipa
 Thogme Zangpo's Thirty-Seven Practices of a Bodhisattva (12th century CE),
 Langri Tangpa's Eight Verses for Training the Mind (c. 1100 CE), and
 Geshe Chekhawa Training the Mind in Seven Points in the 12th century CE.

See also
 Bodhisattva vow
 Bodhisattva Precepts
 Consciousness (Buddhism)

Notes

References

Further reading
 
 
 
 
 
 
 
 
 
  [includes translations of the following: Bodhicitta-sastra, Benkemmitsu-nikyoron, Sammaya-kaijo]

External links

 Compassion and Bodhicitta
 What is bodhicitta? Buddhism for Beginners

Buddhist philosophical concepts
Tibetan Buddhist philosophical concepts